Sebastián Estevanez (born November 4, 1970) is an Argentine actor and model.

Career 
He began his career in 1996 with the role of Rollo in the television series Gino. In 2005 he played the role of Nicolás Pacheco in Amor en custodia next to Osvaldo Laport. In 2009 he stars in the television series Herencia de amor, playing the role of Pedro Sosa/Pedro Ledesma with Diego Olivera, Luz Cipriota and Natalia Lobo. In 2011 he made a special participation in the comedy Cuando me sonreís as Mario Gabardina, Luna Rivas ex-boyfriend. Also in that same year he was part of the Danish film Superclásico, the film tells the story of a 40-year-old man who travels to Buenos Aires with his 16-year-old son to force his wife to sign the divorce papers, although his real and secret intention is he wants to get his wife back again. In the film Estevanez plays a midfielder star of Boca Juniors who is in love with women. In 2012 and 2013 he was the protagonist of the successful television series Dulce Amor with Carina Zampini, Juan Darthés, Segundo Cernadas, Laura Novoa, María Valenzuela, Calu Rivero, Nicolás Riera, Rocío Igarzábal, Georgina Barbarossa, Arturo Bonín, Mercedes Oviedo and Sol Estevanez. Due to the success of Dulce Amor, is summoned again to be the protagonist of the new telenovela of 2014 of Telefe, Camino al amor. In 2017 and 2018 he starred in the Argentina television series Golpe al corazón with  Eleonora Wexler, María Del Cerro, Claudia Lapacó, Stefano de Gregorio, Julián Serrano, Facundo Espinosa, Miguel Ángel Rodríguez, Viviana Saccone, Victorio D'Alessandro, Laura Laprida, Ramiro Blas, Manuela Pal, Georgina Barbarossa, Germán Kraus and Johanna Francella.

Personal life 
Sebastián Estevanez has been married to Ivana Saccani since 2004 with whom he has three children, Francesca Estevanez, Benicio Estevanez and Valentino Estevanez.

Filmography

Television

Movies

References

Argentine male actors
Living people
People from Buenos Aires
1970 births